Michael Jancey "Briny" Baird (born May 11, 1972) is an American professional golfer who has played on the PGA Tour and Buy.com Tour.

Early life
Baird was born in Miami Beach, Florida, the son of professional golfer Butch Baird. He played varsity golf in the 7th grade at Miami Country Day. He originally attended Georgia Tech before transferring to Valdosta State University where he won the NCAA Division II individual golf championship in 1994 and 1995. He turned professional in 1995.

Professional career
Baird won the 2000 Monterrey Open on the Buy.com Tour (now the Korn Ferry Tour). He currently plays on the PGA Tour, but a poor 2005 season saw him lose his card. His highest placing to date on the end of year tour money list was 22nd in 2003. In 2008, he  finished 27th in FedEx Cup, automatically qualifying him for the 2009 PGA Tour season. Although he has never won a PGA Tour event, he has finished second on six separate occasions, most recently at the 2013 McGladrey Classic.

Baird is known for his odd putting style that worked for him when he was doing it as a drill and it just stuck. On May 19, 2009, Baird hit a 230-yard shot from the top of the Omni San Diego Hotel to a bulls-eye in the center of Petco Park in order to give everyone a free chicken wrap at P. F. Chang's China Bistro.

In 2010, Baird entered the final event of the season 125th on the PGA Tour money list. He stumbled in the final round and a number of other players had better finishes. Baird finished 127th on the Tour, two spots out of retaining full Tour status.

In 2011, Baird nearly won his first PGA Tour event, the Frys.com Open. He lost on the sixth playoff hole to Bryce Molder. Despite the loss, the finish moved Baird from 148th to 93rd on the Tour's money list, which meant avoiding Q School.

Baird still has status on the PGA Tour via a medical exemption but he has not played a tour event since 2014.

Baird had the distinction of being the richest golfer never to win a PGA Tour event, earning over $13 million during his career, but coming up short six times. Cameron Tringale now holds that status, as Baird is currently 3rd on that list behind Tringale and also British golfer Brian Davis.

Professional wins (1)

Buy.com Tour wins (1)

Playoff record
PGA Tour playoff record (0–1)

Results in major championships

CUT = missed the half-way cut
"T" = tied

Summary

Most consecutive cuts made – 4 (2001 U.S. Open – 2003 PGA)
Longest streak of top-10s – 0

Results in The Players Championship

CUT = missed the halfway cut
WD = withdrew
"T" indicates a tie for a place

Results in World Golf Championships

QF, R16, R32, R64 = Round in which player lost in match play
"T" = Tied
Note that the HSBC Champions did not become a WGC event until 2009.

See also
1998 PGA Tour Qualifying School graduates
2000 Buy.com Tour graduates

References

External links

American male golfers
Georgia Tech Yellow Jackets men's golfers
PGA Tour golfers
Korn Ferry Tour graduates
Golfers from Florida
Valdosta State University alumni
Miami Country Day School alumni
Sportspeople from Miami Beach, Florida
1972 births
Living people